The 2002 Florida Gators football team represented the University of Florida in the sport of American football during the 2002 college football season.  The Gators competed in Division I-A of the National Collegiate Athletic Association (NCAA) and the Eastern Division of the Southeastern Conference (SEC), and played their home games at Ben Hill Griffin Stadium on the university's Gainesville, Florida campus.  They were led by first-year head coach Ron Zook, who coached them to a second-place finish in the SEC East, an Outback Bowl berth, and an overall record of 8–5 (.615).

Schedule

Roster

Game summaries

UAB

Miami (FL)

Ohio

at Tennessee

Kentucky

at Ole Miss

LSU

Auburn

vs. Georgia

at Vanderbilt

South Carolina

at Florida State

Outback Bowl (vs. Michigan)

References

Bibliography 

 2009 Southeastern Conference Football Media Guide, Florida Year-by-Year Records, Southeastern Conference, Birmingham, Alabama, p. 60 (2009).
  2012 Florida Football Media Guide, University Athletic Association, Gainesville, Florida, pp. 107–116 (2012).
 Carlson, Norm, University of Florida Football Vault: The History of the Florida Gators, Whitman Publishing, LLC, Atlanta, Georgia (2007).  .
 Golenbock, Peter, Go Gators!  An Oral History of Florida's Pursuit of Gridiron Glory, Legends Publishing, LLC, St. Petersburg, Florida (2002).  .
 Hairston, Jack, Tales from the Gator Swamp: A Collection of the Greatest Gator Stories Ever Told, Sports Publishing, LLC, Champaign, Illinois (2002).  .

Florida
Florida Gators football seasons
Florida Gators football